Hypsopygia proboscidalis is a species of snout moth in the genus Hypsopygia. It was described by Strand in 1919. It is found in Taiwan.

References

Moths described in 1919
Pyralini